Ángel Troncho Beltrán (born 2 October 2002) is a Spanish professional footballer who plays as a left winger for CD Vitoria.

Club career
Born in Benicarló, Castellón, Valencian Community, Troncho was a CF Benicarló FB youth graduate. He made his senior debut with the first team CD Benicarló on 23 March 2019, playing the last 20 minutes in a 2–1 Regional Preferente away win over CF Huracán Moncada.

In July 2019, after four first team appearances for Benicarló, Troncho moved to SD Eibar and returned to youth football. He started to feature with the reserves in Tercera División during the 2020–21 season, and renewed his contract until 2025 on 2 November 2020.

Troncho spent the most of the 2021–22 campaign nursing a knee injury, but was still called up to the first team for the 2022 pre-season by manager Gaizka Garitano. He made his professional debut on 10 October 2022, coming on as a second-half substitute for Yanis Rahmani in a 0–0 home draw against CD Mirandés in the Segunda División.

References

External links
 
 
 

2002 births
Living people
People from Baix Maestrat
Spanish footballers
Footballers from the Valencian Community
Association football wingers
Segunda División players
Tercera División players
Tercera Federación players
Divisiones Regionales de Fútbol players
CD Vitoria footballers
SD Eibar footballers